Current Trends in Biotechnology and Pharmacy is an international quarterly research journal dedicated to pharmaceutical and biotechnology research. The journal is published by the Association of Biotechnology and Pharmacy.

Biotechnology journals
Pharmacology journals
Publications established in 2007